Kamilukuak Lake is a large lake in the Kivalliq Region of Nunavut in Canada. Part of the lake to the west lies in the Northwest Territories. The lake is 25 km south of Dubawnt Lake.

See also
List of lakes of Nunavut
List of lakes of Canada

References 

Lakes of Kivalliq Region